Beyenchime-Salaatin is an impact crater (astrobleme) in the Russian Far East.
 
The crater is exposed at the surface and is located in the Beyenchime river basin, south of the course of its left tributary, the Beyenchime Salaata (Бэйэнчимэ-Салаата).

References 

Impact craters of Russia
Eocene impact craters
Impact craters of the Arctic
Landforms of the Sakha Republic